The Old Testament is a greatest-hits album of the group Sunz of Man, released in 2006.

Track listing
"Genesis"
"All We Got" (edit)
"Rivers of Eden"
"Five Arch Angels"
"Soldiers Of Darkness" (featuring 9th Prince, Killa Sin)
"No Love Without Hate"
"Combination of Death"
"Jessica Skit"
"Valley of Kings"
"Tha Law"
"Sin of Man"
"Inmates to the Fire"
"Next Up" (featuring Method Man) [Hidden track]
"Intellectuals" (featuring Raekwon, U-God)
"People Change" (featuring MC Eiht)
"Savior'z Day" (featuring Ghostface Killah)
"Shining Star" (featuring Ol' Dirty Bastard)

Sunz of Man albums
2006 compilation albums
Albums produced by 4th Disciple